The 1923–24 Maltese First Division was the 13th season of top-tier football in Malta.  It was contested by 5 teams, and Sliema Wanderers F.C. won the championship.

League standings

Results

References
Malta - List of final tables (RSSSF)

Maltese Premier League seasons
Malta
football
football